Michael H. Weir Jr. (born September 2, 1948) is an American politician from Maryland and a member of the Democratic Party.

Background

Weir was born in Essex, Maryland on September 2, 1948. He attended the University of Maryland and University of Baltimore. He has been a firefighter with the Baltimore County Fire Department since 1981. Weir has received a number of awards from gun rights organizations.

In the legislature

Delegate Weir is currently serving in his 3rd term in the Maryland House of Delegates, representing Maryland's District 6 in Baltimore County. Weir is a member of the Environmental Matters Committee.

Legislative notes
voted against the Clean Indoor Air Act of 2007 (HB359)
 voted for the Maryland Gang Prosecution Act of 2007 (HB713), subjecting gang members to up to 20 years in prison and/or a fine of up to $100,000 
 voted for Jessica's Law (HB 930), eliminating parole for the most violent child sexual predators and creating a mandatory minimum sentence of 25 years in state prison, 2007 
 voted for Public Safety – Statewide DNA Database System – Crimes of Violence and Burglary – Post conviction (HB 370), helping to give police officers and prosecutors greater resources to solve crimes and eliminating a backlog of 24,000 unanalyzed DNA samples, leading to 192 arrests, 2008 
 voted for Vehicle Laws – Repeated Drunk and Drugged Driving Offenses – Suspension of License (HB 293), strengthening Maryland's drunk driving laws by imposing a mandatory one year license suspension for a person convicted of drunk driving more than once in five years, 2009 
 voted for HB 102, creating the House Emergency Medical Services System Workgroup, leading to Maryland's budgeting of $52 million to fund three new Medevac helicopters to replace the State's aging fleet, 2009 
 voted against Civil Marriage Protection Act (HB438) - civil marriage rights for same-sex couples, 2012 

For the past four years, Delegate Weir has annually voted to support classroom teachers, public schools, police and hospitals in Baltimore County. Since 2002, funding to schools across the State has increased 82%, resulting in Maryland being ranked top in the nation for K-12 education.

Election results

2002 Race for Maryland House of Delegates – District 6
Voters to choose three:
{| class="wikitable"
|-
!Name
!Votes
!Percent
!Outcome
|-
|-
|John S. Arnick Dem.
|17,541
|  20.87%
|   Won
|-
|-
|Joseph J. Minnick, Dem.
|17,530
|  20.85%
|   Won
|-
|-
|Michael H. Weir Jr., Dem.
|17,958
|  21.36%
|   Won
|-
|-
|Jane Brooks, Rep.
|12,517
|  14.89%
|   Lost
|-
|-
|Bruce Laing, Rep.
|9,448
|  11.24%
|   Lost
|-
|-
|Paul Michael Blitz, Rep.
|8,969
|  10.67%
|   Lost
|-
|Other Write-Ins
|106
|  0.13%
|   Lost
|-
|}

References

Democratic Party members of the Maryland House of Delegates
Living people
1948 births
People from Essex, Maryland
21st-century American politicians